Michel Pereira (born 6 October 1993) is a Brazilian mixed martial artist currently competing as a Welterweight in the Ultimate Fighting Championship. A professional competitor since 2011, he formerly competed for 300 Sparta, Akhmat Fight Club, Serbian Battle Championship, Jungle Fight, Xtreme Fighting Championships and Road Fighting Championship. He is a former Serbian Battle Championship Welterweight Champion. As of February 14, 2023, he is #15 in the UFC welterweight rankings.

Background
Pereira was born in Tucumã, Pará, Brazil. He started training karate at the age of 12, complementing his skillset with Brazilian jiu-jitsu from the age of 16 onwards.

Mixed martial arts career

Early career
Michel Pereira began his professional mixed martial arts career fighting in regional promotions of his native state of Brazil, Pará, as well as 300 Sparta, amassing a professional record of 9–3 with notable wins over the veterans Daziel da Silva Jr. and Silmar Nunes. These early wins earned a chance to fight with the bigger promotions. Such as Jungle Fight and XFC.

In his first fight and only fight with Jungle Fight, he faced Junior Orgulho. He won by a unanimous decision.

His next fight was a loss versus Junior de Oliveira with Iron Man CF. After a win against Caio Robson, Michel Pereira earned a contract with XFC. Fighting on the prelims of XFC International 7, Pereira faced Geraldo Coelho. Responding to his opponent's pressure with clinching and a takedown, Pereira ended the fight in the third round by way of a guillotine choke. His next fight was on the prelims of XFC International 9, during which he faced Cairo Rocha. With various techniques such as wheel kicks and flying knees, Michel earned a victory through a unanimous decision. These two victories gave him a main even fight against Carlston Harris, which Pereira lost through a unanimous decision.

Following this Pereira fought with various promotions during which he lost a decision against Abubakar Vagaev, Ismael de Jesus and Kurbanjiang Tuluosibake, while also netting wins against Stanley Barbosa by way of an arm triangle choke, as well decisions against Renato Gomes and Cristiano Estela Rios.

Serbian Battle Championship and Road FC

His 16–8 record earned him a chance to fight for the vacant SBC Welterweight Championship against Luka Strezoski at SBC 15 on 8 December 2017. Pereira won a majority decision.  Pereira was scheduled to defend his SBC title against Laerte Costa at SBC 17 on 18 April 2018. He won the fight by a first-round rear naked choke submission.

Moving away from SBC, Pereira was scheduled to face Carlos Perira at Arena Fight 8 on 12 May 2018, in a 176 lbs catchweight bout. The fight ended in a no-contest, due to a cage malfunction.

His next fight was likewise a 176 lbs catchweight about, against Ryul Kim at HEAT 42 on 27 May 2018. The fight was Pereira's South Korean debut. Pereira won the fight by a first-round technical knockout. Pereira was next scheduled to face Hea Jun Yang at Road FC 48. He won the fight by a first-round technical knockout. Pereira remained on the South Korean circuit for his next fight, being scheduled to fight Batmunkh Burenzorig at HEAT 43 on 17 September 2018. Although he won the fight by a read-naked choke submission, the result was later overturned into a no-contest, due to Periera missing weight.

Pereira was scheduled to make his second SBC Middlweight title defense against Duško Todorović at SBC 19 on 1 December 2018. Todorović won the fight by a first-round technical knockout.

Periera was scheduled to face Won Jun Choi at Road FC 051 XX on 15 December 2018, in a 190 lbs catchweight bout. Pereira won the fight by a 41-second knockout. Pereira was scheduled to face the heavyweight Dae Sung Kim at Road FC 052 on 23 February 2019, in an openweight bout. Pereira beat Kim by a second-round technical knockout.

Ultimate Fighting Championship

Pereira's first fight in the UFC was scheduled for 18 May 2019 at UFC Fight Night 152 against Danny Roberts Pereira utilized unorthodox striking techniques, including an attempted showtime kick, and superman punch, before winning the fight via knockout early in round one. Periera was awarded a Performance of the Night award.

Pereira's next fight was scheduled for UFC Fight Night 158 against Sergey Khandozhko. Sergey would face visa issues and was replaced by the Canadian Tristan Connelly. Pereira missed weight by 2 pounds. He lost the fight via unanimous decision. MMA Junkie would pick this fight as their "Upset of the Year". The fight was awarded a Fight of the Night award. for which Pereira was ineligible as he missed weight, which meant Pereira forfeited 30% of his purse, as well as his $50,000 share of the FOTN award

Pereira's third UFC opponent was Diego Sanchez whom he faced at UFC Fight Night 167 on 15 February 2020. Pereira dominated Sanchez for most of the fight but was disqualified for hitting Sanchez with an illegal knee while he was grounded.

Pereira faced Zelim Imadaev on 5 September 2020 at UFC Fight Night 176. There was controversy during the weigh-ins as Imadaev slapped Pereira in the face, and both had to be restrained by the event's staff. Pereira dominated the fight, and slapped Imadaev back several times, before winning the fight via submission in the third round. This win earned him a Performance of the Night award.

Pereira faced Khaos Williams on 19 December 2020 at UFC Fight Night 183. He won the fight via unanimous decision.

Pereira faced Niko Price on 10 July 2021 at UFC 264. He won the fight via unanimous decision.

Pereira was scheduled to face Muslim Salikhov on 15 January 2022 at UFC on ESPN 32.  However, Salikhov withdrew from the bout for undisclosed reasons and the bout was cancelled.

Pereira fought André Fialho on 22 January 2022 at UFC 270. He won the fight by unanimous decision.

Pereira faced Santiago Ponzinibbio on May 21, 2022 at UFC Fight Night 206. He won the fight via split decision. This fight earned him the Fight of the Night award.

Pereira was scheduled to face Sean Brady on March 25, 2023, at UFC on ESPN 43.  However, Brady pulled out in mid-February due to a tore groin and the bout was scrapped.

Championships and achievements

Mixed martial arts
Ultimate Fighting Championship
Performance of the Night (Two Times)  
Fight of the Night (Two Times) 
Serbian Battle Championship
Serbian Battle Championship Welterweight Championship (One time)
One Successful Title Defence
MMAjunkie.com
2022 May Fight of the Month

Mixed martial arts record
 

|-
|Win
|align=center|28–11 (2)
|Santiago Ponzinibbio
|Decision (split)
|UFC Fight Night: Holm vs. Vieira
|
|align=center|3
|align=center|5:00
|Las Vegas, Nevada, United States
|
|-
|Win
|align=center|27–11 (2)
|André Fialho
|Decision (unanimous)
|UFC 270
|
|align=center|3
|align=center|5:00
|Anaheim, California, United States
|
|-
|Win
|align=center|26–11 (2)
|Niko Price
|Decision (unanimous)
|UFC 264 
|
|align=center|3
|align=center|5:00
|Las Vegas, Nevada, United States
|
|-
|Win
|align=center|25–11 (2)
|Khaos Williams
|Decision (unanimous)
|UFC Fight Night: Thompson vs. Neal
|
|align=center|3
|align=center|5:00
|Las Vegas, Nevada, United States
|
|-
|Win
|align=center|24–11 (2)
|Zelim Imadaev
|Technical Submission (rear-naked choke)
|UFC Fight Night: Overeem vs. Sakai
|
|align=center|3
|align=center|4:39
|Las Vegas, Nevada, United States
|
|-
|Loss
|align=center|23–11 (2)
|Diego Sanchez
|DQ (illegal knee)
|UFC Fight Night: Anderson vs. Błachowicz 2 
|
|align=center|3
|align=center|3:09
|Rio Rancho, New Mexico, United States
|
|-
|Loss
|align=center|23–10 (2)
|Tristan Connelly
|Decision (unanimous)
|UFC Fight Night: Cowboy vs. Gaethje 
|
|align=center|3
|align=center|5:00
|Vancouver, British Columbia, Canada
| 
|-
|Win
|align=center|23–9 (2)
|Danny Roberts
|KO (flying knee and punch)
|UFC Fight Night: dos Anjos vs. Lee 
|
|align=center|1
|align=center|1:47
|Rochester, New York, United States
|
|-
|Win
|align=center|22–9 (2)
|Dae Sung Kim
|TKO (knees)
|Road FC 052
|
|align=center|2
|align=center|1:02
|Seoul, South Korea
|
|-
|Win
|align=center|21–9 (2)
|Won Jun Choi
|KO (punch)
|Road FC 051 XX
|
|align=center|1
|align=center|0:41
|Seoul, South Korea
|
|-
|Loss
|align=center|20–9 (2)
|Duško Todorović
|TKO (punches)
|Serbian Battle Championship 19
|
|align=center|1
|align=center|4:32
|Novi Sad, Serbia
|
|-
|NC
|align=center|20–8 (2)
|Batmunkh Burenzorig 
|NC (overturned)
|HEAT 43
|
|align=center|5
|align=center|1:46
|Aichi, Japan
|
|-
|Win
|align=center|20–8 (1)
|Hea Jun Yang
|TKO (knee and punches)
|Road FC 48
|
|align=center|3
|align=center|1:48
|Wonju, South Korea
|
|-
|Win
|align=center|19–8 (1)
|Ryul Kim
|TKO 
|HEAT 42
|
|align=center|1
|align=center|0:51
|Aichi, Japan
|
|-
|NC
|align=center|18–8 (1)
|Carlos Perira
|NC (cage malfunction)
|Arena Fight 8
|
|align=center|1
|align=center|2:52
|Redenção, Brazil
|
|-
|Win
|align=center|18–8
|Laerte Costa
|Submission (rear-naked choke)
|SBC 17
|
|align=center|1
|align=center|4:02
|Odžaci, Serbia
|
|-
|Win
|align=center|17–8
|Luka Strezoski
|Decision (majority)
|SBC 15
|
|align=center|3
|align=center|5:00
|Novi Sad, Serbia
|
|-
|Loss
|align=center|16–8
|Kurbanjiang Tuluosibake
|Decision (unanimous)
|Kunlun Fight MMA 15
|
|align=center|3
|align=center|5:00
|Alashan, Mongolia
|
|-
|Win
|align=center|16–7
|Renato Gomes
|Submission (triangle choke)
|TAURA MMA 1
|
|align=center|3
|align=center|0:54
|Viamão, Brazil
|
|-
|Win
|align=center|15–7
|Cristiano Estela Rios
|Decision (unanimous)
|Fusion FC 24
|
|align=center|3
|align=center|5:00
|Lima, Peru
|
|-
|Loss
|align=center|14–7
|Ismael de Jesus
|Decision (unanimous)
|Shooto Brasil 67
|
|align=center|3
|align=center|5:00
|Rio de Janeiro, Brazil
|
|-
|Win
|align=center|14–6
|Stanley Barbosa
|Submission (arm-triangle choke)
|Revelation FC 4
|
|align=center|1
|align=center|4:56
|Belém, Brazil
|
|-
|Loss
|align=center|13–6
|Abubakar Vagaev
|Decision (unanimous)
|Akhmat Fight Show 18
|
|align=center|3
|align=center|5:00
|Grozny, Russia
|
|-
|Loss
|align=center|13–5
|Carlston Harris
|Decision (unanimous)
|XFC International 12
|
|align=center|3
|align=center|5:00
|São Paulo, Brazil
|
|-
|Win
|align=center|13–4
|Cairo Rocha
|Decision (unanimous)
|XFC International 9
|
|align=center|5
|align=center|5:00
|São Paulo, Brazil
|
|-
|Win
|align=center|12–4
|Geraldo Coelho
|Submission (guillotine choke)
|XFC International 7
|
|align=center|1
|align=center|2:40
|São Paulo, Brazil
|
|-
|Win
|align=center|11–4
|Caio Robson Silva
|TKO (retirement)
|Arena Fight 6
|
|align=center|1
|align=center|5:00
|Redenção, Brazil
|
|-
|Loss
|align=center|10–4
|Zozimar de Oliveria Silva Jr.
|Submission (armbar)
|Iron Man CF 18
|
|align=center|2
|align=center|5:00
|Belém, Brazil
|
|-
|Win
|align=center|10–3
|Alfredo Souza
|Decision (unanimous)
|Jungle Fight 65
|
|align=center|3
|align=center|5:00
|Madre de Deus, Brazil
|
|-
|Win
|align=center|9–3
|Silmar Nunes
|Submission (triangle choke)
|Tucumã Fighting Show 5
|
|align=center|1
|align=center|4:18
|Tucumã, Brazil
|
|-
|Win
|align=center|8–3
|Jaime Cordoba
|Decision (unanimous)
|300 Sparta MMA 4
|
|align=center|3
|align=center|5:00
|Lima, Peru
|
|-
|Win
|align=center|7–3
|Daziel Serafrim da Silva Jr.
|Decision (unanimous)
|The Green Fight
|
|align=center|3
|align=center|5:00
|Paragominas, Brazil
|
|-
|Win
|align=center|6–3
|Renato Puente Flores
|Submission (armbar)
|300 Sparta MMA 3
|
|align=center|1
|align=center|5:00
|Lima, Peru
|
|-
|Win
|align=center|5–3
|Reginaldo Ferreira Alves
|TKO
|Arena Sport Combat
|
|align=center|1
|align=center|4:12
|Xinguara, Brazil
|
|-
|Win
|align=center|4–3
|Franciney dos Santos Bessa
|TKO (doctor stoppage)
|Marajó Fight 5
|
|align=center|1
|align=center|1:52
|Soure, Brazil
|
|-
|Loss
|align=center|3–3
|Rubenilton Perreira
|Decision (unanimous)
|MMA Dragon Fighters
|
|align=center|3
|align=center|5:00
|Ourilândia do Norte, Brazil
|
|-
|Loss
|align=center|3–2
|Rubenilton Perreira
|Decision (unanimous)
|Tucumã Fighting Show 3
|
|align=center|3
|align=center|5:00
|Tucumã, Brazil
|
|-
|Loss
|align=center|3–1
|Bruno Leandro Soares
|Decision (unanimous)
|Colisão Top Fight
|
|align=center|3
|align=center|5:00
|Tucumã, Brazil
|
|-
|Win
|align=center|3–0
|Sivaldo Alves da Silva
|Decision (unanimous)
|Tucumã Fighting Show 2
|
|align=center|3
|align=center|5:00
|Tucumã, Brazil
|
|-
|Win
|align=center|2–0
|Magno Silva
|TKO (punches)
|Tucumã Fighting Show 1
|
|align=center|2
|align=center|5:00
|Tucumã, Brazil
|
|-
|Win
|align=center|1–0
|Edson Dias
|TKO (punches)
|Dragon Fight Championship
|
|align=center|1
|align=center|3:20
|Ourilândia do Norte, Brazil
|
|-
|}

See also
List of current UFC fighters
List of male mixed martial artists

References

External links
 

1993 births
Living people
Brazilian male mixed martial artists
Welterweight mixed martial artists
Mixed martial artists utilizing Brazilian jiu-jitsu
Mixed martial artists utilizing karate
Brazilian male karateka
Brazilian practitioners of Brazilian jiu-jitsu
People awarded a black belt in Brazilian jiu-jitsu
Ultimate Fighting Championship male fighters
People from Marabá
Sportspeople from Pará